Hey Amigo! A Toast to Your Death (also known as Ehi amigo... Rest in Peace) is a 1970 Italian Spaghetti Western film directed by Paolo Bianchini  and starring Wayde Preston.

Plot
Dove Williams, a postal officer, pursues a gang of violent outlaws that rob a Texas stagecoach.

Cast 

 Wayde Preston as 'Doc' Williams 
 Rik Battaglia as  Barnett 
  Aldo Berti as  Black  
  Agnès Spaak as  Pachita
 Raf Baldassarre as   Manolo 
  Marco Zuanelli as   El Loco  
 Franca Scagnetti as   Nathaniel's Wife

References

External links

Spanish Western (genre) films
Spaghetti Western films
1970 Western (genre) films
1970 films
Films directed by Paolo Bianchini
Films scored by Carlo Savina
1970s Italian films